Medeus is a genus of mites in the family Acaridae.

Species
 Medeus ithacaensis O'Connor, 1997
 Medeus vesparius Volgin, 1974

References

Acaridae